Maimonides School (Hebrew: ישיבת רמב"ם Yeshivat Rambam) is a coeducational, Modern Orthodox, Jewish day school located in Brookline, Massachusetts. The school was founded in 1937 by Rabbi Joseph Soloveitchik and his wife Tonya Soloveitchik. It is named after Rabbi Moses Maimonides.

Today, Maimonides is a Torah institution with approximately 550 students from early childhood (2–4 years) through grade twelve with over 2,000 alumni, including multiple Rhodes Scholars, National Merit Scholars, prominent professors, scientists and business leaders. More than 325 of them are living in Israel.

Student body

Most Maimonides Students reside in Newton (40%), Brookline (22%), and the Sharon area (Sharon, Stoughton, Canton, Malden [21%]). As of 2020, Maimonides has 3 students in Rhode Island. Other areas include Watertown, Natick, Needham, Boston, Cambridge, Westborough, Melrose, Waltham, and Bedford.

Occasionally, a student from a distant state or European country joins the student body, after making independent boarding arrangements. Each year several Israelis whose families are temporarily studying or working in Greater Boston join the student body. Students from several feeder day schools augment the student population at transition points such as Grade 6 or 9.

Campus

Maimonides School currently is situated on a  campus in central Brookline, and is housed in one building.

Saval Campus

The Saval campus, named after Maurice Saval, a longtime school Chairman and benefactor, includes the Elementary School (kindergarten through grade five), Middle School (grades six through eight), Upper School (grades nine through twelve), business office, and other administrative offices. Other features of the Saval campus are the Judge J. John Fox gymnasium, S. Joseph Solomont Synagogue, 22,000 volume Levy library and Beit Midrash (house of religious Judaic study), laboratories, a student lounge, and additional office and study space. The inner courtyard includes a SprinTurf playing surface—the Ezra Schwartz Field—for outdoor play. The Esther Edelman Learning Center has undergone a cosmetic upgrade with new furniture, computers, air-conditioning and thermal pane windows. The Middle School level includes the Study Zone, a nurse's office, an art room, a science lab and a social worker's office.

Brener building

Between 1998-2019, the elementary school was housed in the Brener building, which is across the street from the Saval building, where the Elementary School had formerly been. In addition to classrooms, the building contained a lunchroom, small gym, admissions office, and library. Grades E2 - 5 also had their own playground for recess.

The Brener building is named for Leonard Brener, noted philanthropist (to Maimonides and the Perkins School for the Blind among other worthy educational causes). A decorated detective with the Boston Police Department, Mr. Brener was known affectionately as 'Brennan' to his (mostly Irish) coworkers. After his retirement from law enforcement, he became a financial advisor, achieving the rank of Senior Vice President with Dean Whitter Reynolds. In addition to the Brener building itself, Mr. Brener donated the art room on the Saval campus in memory of his sister.

Nearing the end of the 2018-2019 school year, it was announced that due to decreased enrollment and a tighter budget, the following year the Elementary School would be moving back into the Saval building. Brookline Public Schools currently rent out the Brener building. The Maimonides preschool, however, is currently located at a nearby synagogue, Congregation Beth El.

Student activities

Current clubs and activities

The following is an incomplete list of different middle and upper school student-run clubs and organizations, and other extracurricular activities (listed alphabetically):
School Newspaper (Spectrum)
Published on the first day of every month, Spectrum contains school news, world news, sports, entertainment, world language, and opinion sections. Spectrum is now online at http://www.maimospectrum.com. 
Mock trial
The 2009 team was the most successful team in Maimonides history having won the Massachusetts State Championship. The National Competition in Atlanta, Georgia accommodated Maimonides School in allowing the team to compete on Friday, thereby allowing the students to keep Shabbat-observance. Because of this deviation, the power ranking system did not apply to Maimonides, and the team was placed in the ranking at number 20, tied with Maine. The only previous time the team had qualified for the Massachusetts State Tournament was a Sweet 16 finish in 2006. The 2010 team reached the Sweet 16, the 2012 team reached the Final 4, and the 2013 team reached the Elite Eight. The 2021 team had a Sweet 16 finish in the Massachusetts State Tournament, competing for the first time over Zoom, due to the Covid-19 Pandemic.
Model United Nations Annually, the Maimonides School delegation receives multiple awards at the Yeshiva University National Model United Nations.
Troop 54, Boy Scouts of America
Chessed Committee who coordinate seasonal supply-drives, volunteer days, and awareness speakers. 
Chidon Hatanach (National Bible Contest)- Menachem Shindler, the 2009 North American Champion, won 2nd in the Diaspora and 5th in the World contests in the Yom Haatzmaut Chidon HaTanach HaOlami contest.  Alexander Kahan was the 2010 North American Champion, competed in the 2011 Chidon HaTanach HaOlami contest.  Past Chidon Hatanach champions from Maimonides include Yechiel Robinson and Yochanan Stein.
David Project Club which teaches students about current events and Israel Advocacy.
Drama Club (produces annual high school drama production - http://www.freewebs.com/maimonidesdramaclub)
Girls' Choir (Kol Isha)
Jazz Band
Junior Achievement: Titan
The 2006 Co-state-champion Titan team placed fourth in the northeast, and thirteenth nationally.
Literary Magazine (The Current)
Has won several awards in the past, noted for its creativity in original music pieces, photography, poetry, and short stories.
The Weekly Briefing
"The Weekly Briefing" is a weekly newspaper containing articles about various news stories pertaining to the last week's worth of current events. The paper also posts the weekly schedule and events, a list of student birthdays, puzzles and trivia. It is posted every week.
Math team
The 2006 team won second place in their division in the New England region.
The 2018 team came in first in a competition between over 150 Jewish day schools in the world.

MAC (Math Appreciation Club)
Kol Hamayim is a weekly student-run parsha publication.  
AIPAC Club
Recycling Club
The Maimonides Politics Club
Gittel's Soup Kitchen is a student-run Brighton-based soup kitchen. It is the only kosher soup kitchen in New England.
Student Council
Book Club
Yachad Board is a subgroup of Greater Boston Yachad, a chapter of Yachad/National Jewish Council for Disabilities
Yearbook (Halapid)
 Mishmar Talmud
 Once taught by Rabbi Dovid Shapiro, now taught by Rabbi Yaakov Jaffe. Each Thursday night following the days worth of classes, high school students are invited to learn extra Gemara. In 2010, the group studied masechet Sanhedrin.
 Boys Choir-- "Kol Dodi Dofek"
 Book Club

Athletics
Maimonides is a member of the Massachusetts Interscholastic Athletic Association. Interscholastic sports include basketball, soccer, softball, volleyball, and tennis.  The school's teams are named the M-Cats.  In November 2010, the school's athletic teams received the MIAA Sportsmanship Award in recognition of their good sportsmanship.

Boys teams
Baseball (Varsity and Junior Varsity - Division III North)
Intramural Football
Basketball (Varsity, Junior Varsity and Middle School - Division IV North)
Intramural Hockey
Soccer (Varsity - Division III North)
Tennis (Varsity & Junior Varsity)
Wrestling (Varsity)

Girls teams
Basketball (Varsity, Junior Varsity and Middle School - Division IV North)
Intramural Hockey
Soccer (Varsity - Division III North)
Softball (Varsity - Division III North)
Volleyball (Junior Varsity & Varsity - Division III North)
Tennis (Varsity & Junior Varsity)

Students versus faculty

Faculty Basketball Game

This game is a longstanding tradition that matches the male members of the senior class against the male faculty in a game of basketball, proceeds from which are donated to charity. The 2008 game was particularly exciting, as the seniors raced back from a large deficit to tie and win the game in the last few minutes.  In 2009 the faculty won the game for the first time, only to lose again by one point in 2010. In 2011 the game was an easy win for the seniors, but the faculty won again in 2012 and 2013. The faculty won in 2017. In an incredibly close game in 2018, the seniors beat the faculty.

Major school events

Annual Gala
Discontinued in 2012

Chanukah Chagiga

Every Chanukah, the Student Council and student activities director plan an upper school black-tie banquet/chagiga. Each year's banquet has a different theme, which is expressed through decor and furnishings. The upper school jazz band performs before and during the festive catered meal and there is generally some other form of live entertainment afterwards. Magicians, hypnotists, Blue Fringe, and Hello Sid have performed in the past. Many students choose to invite friends from other schools, transforming the banquet into an annual gathering of the local high school Jewish community.

Student chessed leaders  typically run chessed (charity) drives throughout the year and run a Toy Drive in memory of beloved English teacher Sharon Steiff and beloved parent Judy Epstein during the holiday season. The leaders often coordinate with the administration for students to pay reduced admission to the chaggiga when they bring a toy for the Toy Drive.

Upper School plays

The drama production is performed once a year by the Maimonides Drama Club, generally in mid-March, in the Fox gymnasium. It is directed and acted by students exclusively with no financial assistance from the school.

Past plays:
 The Glass Menagerie - 2018- directed by  
 The Importance of Being Ernest - 2017- directed by Arthur Bloomfield
 The 39 Steps by Patrick Barlow - 2013- Directed by Joseph Ehrenkranz and Etai Shuchatowitz
 Twelfth Night by William Shakespeare - 2012- Directed by Eitan Kahn
 Awkward 2011, an original play written and directed by Naftali Ehrenkranz
 Flip 2010- Directed by Stephanie Guedalia
 Lost in Yonkers by Neil Simon - 2009- Directed by Jesse Turk
 The Mousetrap by Agatha Christie - 2008- Directed by Davida Wolfson
  The Children's Hour   by Lillian Hellman - 2007- Directed by Doron Bloomfield
 Lend Me a Tenor by Ken Ludwig - 2006- Directed by Ross Eisenberg
 Noises Off by Michael Frayn - 2005
 Rumors by Neil Simon - 2004
 The Complete Works of William Shakespeare (Abridged) by the Reduced Shakespeare Company - 2003 Directed by Chanan Berkovits
 A Midsummer Night's Dream by William Shakespeare
 Don't Drink the Water (1995) Directed by Eliav Bock
 The Man who Came to Dinner (1994) Directed by Avi Weiss
 Arsenic and Old Lace (1993) Directed by David Galper
 The Importance of Being Earnest by Oscar Wilde - 1985
 Arsenic and Old Lace by Joseph Kesselring - 1984

In 2006, the school Drama Club introduced the Secondary play (renamed The S.P.O.T.Y, or The Second Play Of The Year), a short play directed by the next year's producer of the Primary production. The one-acts, which are considerably shorter and of lower budget than the main production, bring drama to students who have no prior experience acting, or who cannot commit the time to the full-length play.

Past short plays:
Sorry, Wrong Number by Lucille Fletcher -Directed by Stephanie Guedalia 2009
Plaza Suite by Neil Simon - Directed by Jesse Turk 2008 (only the third act)
Act III, Scene V by Terry Ortwein - Directed by Jessica Kasmer-Jacobs 2007
The Actor's Nightmare by Christopher Durang - Directed by Doron Bloomfield 2006

Purim Shpiel

Each year the Shpiel is performed by the Senior Class as a series of comedy skits with the intent of poking fun at faculty members. Shpiels have traditionally featured only stage performances, but recent spiels include multimedia comedy.  The Purim Shpiel is an annual source of tension between administrators, who review drafts for defamatory and unsavory material, and students, who often sneak in inappropriate material. The Purim Shpiel was shut down mid-performance by the faculty in 1996 and 2006. In light of certain teachers taking particular offense to the 2009 Shpiel, though it was reviewed by the administration, the administration took further precautionary measures and watched a full run-through of the 2010 shpiel before granting full approval. The 2012 Shpiel ended in a suspension for one of the students.  The 2013 Shpiel involved controversy over content that was barred by the administrators and inappropriate distribution of censored material. The 2014 shpiel, though initially canceled by the administration due to worry about inappropriate content may be re instituted due to student complaints.

Chagigat HaSiddur

The Chagigat HaSiddur is an annual event, commonly known as the "Siddur Play", where the 1st graders receive their first siddur (prayerbook). Before the Chagigah they pray from either abbreviated siddurim or siddurim owned by the school. Afterwards they pray each day from their very own complete siddur. At the Chagigah, each 1st grade class performs a musical skit that addresses some aspect of prayer. The ceremony concludes with the teachers and principals calling up each student individually to receive his or her inscribed and specially bound siddur. The event is looked forward to with great anticipation by the students and their families, and usually ends with a festive party for the students and community.

Chagigat HaChumash

The Chagigat HaChumash is an annual event where the second grade students receive their first chumash (Bible). At the Chagigah, each 2nd grade class performs a musical skit that addresses some aspect of Torah learning. The ceremony concludes with the teachers and principals calling up each student individually to receive his or her inscribed and specially bound Chumash. After the students receive their Chumashim, everyone enjoys light refreshments. The students start learning from their new Chumashim after parshat Lech Lechah.

Chesed Day
(Also known as Yom Chesed) For the past few years, the Upper School Chesed (charity) Committee, with assistance from the student activities director, has organized a day when the entire middle and upper school student body leave school for a day and volunteer at different area community service destinations.  Past recipients have included the Blue Hills, Pine Street Inn, the Esplanade Association, the Coolidge House nursing home, the Department of Conservation and Recreation, Greater Boston Food Bank, Hebrew Rehabilitation Center, Rosie's Place, Cradles to Crayons, The Franklin Park Zoo and the New England Veterans Shelter.  Currently, in order to make planning of Chesed Day easier, each grade has its own Chesed Day.

Battle of the Bands
Every holiday of Sukkot (Festival of Tabernacles), the school holds a Battle of the Bands. Bands typically form for the sole purpose of competing in Battle of the Bands. The competition is generally made up of rock, jazz, and blues bands, though there has been music of other genres.  The method of choosing a winner varies year to year from student voting to faculty judges.  Past champions include two-time winner Brown Iris and One Fish, Jew Fish. For the first time in Maimonides history, in the 2008 Battle of the Bands, a 7th grade band ("Etai and the Others") won, beating four other bands including Brown Iris.

Color War and Maccabia

Color War
Color War takes place annually in the Elementary School. Teams are led by 5th grade captains, who coordinate the action as their teammates compose songs and cheers, make a poster, write a D'var Torah, perform skits and motivate their teammates to win.

Maccabia
The Maccabia is a series of sporting events that takes place every few years in grades seven through twelve. Generally organized by the Student Council, it is led by two captains from each class. Upper school Maccabia took place in 2002, 2006, 2007, 2008, 2009, 2010, 2011, 2012, 2013, 2014, 2015, 2016, 2017, and 2018.

Controversies

Finances and governance

In late 2005, the school faced mounting budget deficits. To help alleviate the deficit, the School's Board of Directors initiated cost-cutting, layoffs, and an extraordinary fund-raising effort. The school successfully balanced its budget for 2006–07 and seemed to have achieved that with which most Jewish Day Schools continually struggle—correcting financial course without severely damaging enrollment or the quality of its education. At the same time, the school's governance structure changed. Formerly managed by a 7-member school committee, the school was now governed by a new board and a new board chair, Timberland CEO Jeff Swartz. The school committee became much smaller (3 members) and supervised only one person, the school's Rosh Yeshiva.

After the cost-cutting measures, the school was sued for age and gender discrimination by three of the laid-off teachers.  On July 3, 2009, The Jewish Advocate reported on the outcome of the Deborah Onie case: "The court found, however, that the reason the school gave for not renewing the contract was non-discriminatory, as it related only to her refusal to accept the authority of [principals] Klammer and Posner.  In 2005, Onie brought the allegation of age discrimination to the Massachusetts Commission Against Discrimination, the state's chief civil rights agency, which was unable to conclude that there was a violation of statutes."  The Evelyn Berman and Phyllis Schwartz cases were settled out of court.

According to varying news reports, the private Maurice Saval trust, whose sole beneficiary is the school, lost between three and eight million dollars due to the Bernard Madoff scandal.  In April 2009, the school did not renew several teacher contracts due to the financial crisis caused by the Madoff scam, and to increased demand for financial aid caused by the recession. The school also raised tuition 9.9% to meet rising expenses, its highest increase.

Additional teacher layoffs occurred in the spring of 2010 due to a decline in enrollment in the elementary and upper school divisions. Class sizes were increased and the number of high school sections was decreased. With these decreases in the number of faculty came an increase in the size of the administration. In 2009, Barry Ehrlich, a former NH high school history teacher and former Head of School of NYU Langone's Child Study Center was hired as the school's K-12 Director of Curriculum. In 2010, the administration was expanded again with the hiring of a high school assistant principal, Rabbi Dov Huff, an alumnus.

The school announced on May 6, 2018 that for the 2019 - 2020 school year that they plan on renting out the Brener building and consolidating all of the school into the Saval building in order to further reduce expenses.

Notable alumni

Binyamin Appelbaum '96, journalist at the New York Times
Yoni Appelbaum ’98 politics editor of TheAtlantic.com and a senior editor of the Atlantic magazine.
Steven Bayme '67, essayist and author
Etan Cohen '92, Hollywood screenwriter and Director
Eliot Cohen '73, influential neo-conservative and professor of foreign policy at Johns Hopkins University
Adam (AJ) Edelman, Olympian and 4x Israeli Champion in the sport of skeleton.
Noah Feldman '88, Rhodes Scholar, Harvard law professor, critic of Modern Orthodoxy
Marc Gopin '75, director of the Center on Religion, Diplomacy and Conflict Resolution, George Mason University
Jessica Hammer, Professor of computer games at Carnegie Mellon University.
Matthew Levitt '88, a senior fellow at The Washington Institute for Near East Policy, specializing in terrorism and US policy
Asher Lopatin '82, Rhodes Scholar, former rabbi in ASBI Congregation in Chicago, president of Yeshivat Chovevei Torah
Barry Lowenkron '69, former U.S. Assistant Secretary of State for Democracy, Human Rights, and Labor
Esther Petrack '10, Contestant on Cycle 15 of America's Next Top Model
Haym Soloveitchik '54, historian at Yeshiva University and the only son of Rabbi Joseph B. Soloveitchik
Michael Strassfeld '67, rabbi, co-author of The Jewish Catalog
Mayer Twersky '78, Rosh Yeshiva, Yeshiva University-RIETS

School song

The Maimonides School Song was last revived at the school's 50th anniversary Gala in 1988. More recently it was brought back by the Fifth Grade Chorus at the 2010 Maimonides Gala. It is sung to "Ode to Joy" from Beethoven's Ninth Symphony. It was written by  Ralph Tucker, an English teacher in the early years of the school.  The following text is taken from the 1965 yearbook.

Praise to thee our alma mater;Hail to thee Maimonides;Homage at this time we pay theeWhom we laud for all of these:
For the wisdom of the Torah,For our training secular,For the light of learning shiningBright before us like a star.
Guide us in our way of living;Teach us as the torch we seizeValues true and everlasting,Hail to thee, Maimonides.

In addition, there is a Hebrew version of the song:

תהילה לבית ספרנו
הברכה לישיבה
לך לנצח חיבתנו
לרמב"ם התהילה

תמורת חכמה ודעת תורה,
תמורת לימודים כלליים
כנוגה נוצץ אורה
אנו תודה לך מביעים.

הדריכנו בחיינו
ובידינו אבוקה
לך לנצח חיבתנו
לרמב"ם התפארה.

References

Further reading

External links

History
MIAA
School Listing
Coaching Staff

Modern Orthodox Jewish day schools in the United States
Educational institutions established in 1937
Buildings and structures in Brookline, Massachusetts
School
Private high schools in Massachusetts
Schools in Norfolk County, Massachusetts
Private middle schools in Massachusetts
Private elementary schools in Massachusetts
1937 establishments in Massachusetts
Jewish day schools in Massachusetts